Pseudomeges is a genus of longhorn beetles of the subfamily Lamiinae, containing the following species:

 Pseudomeges marmoratus (Westwood, 1848)
 Pseudomeges varioti Le Moult, 1946

References

Lamiini